Edmund Zygfryd Trebus (11 November 1918 – 29 September 2002) was a compulsive hoarder who came to fame when he was featured on the British television documentary series A Life of Grime.

Biography
Edmund Trebus was born in Ostrowo, near Danzig (Gdańsk), German Empire (now Poland), on 11 November 1918, the day of the Armistice.

When Nazi Germany invaded Poland in 1939 Trebus was conscripted into the Wehrmacht. He was then captured and served with the Allied forces in Italy, in an anti-tank unit of the II Corps of the Polish armed forces, which was under British command.

After moving to England just after the Second World War, Trebus married Jozefa Noga in 1949. They had five children.

Trebus had been a collector all his life and he was often seen pushing a handcart filled with his latest acquisitions, which he carefully sorted into separate piles in his garden and home. One of Trebus's major loves was Elvis Presley, and he managed to collect and store away a copy of almost every single Elvis record.

In his eighties, living alone in a run-down house in Crouch End in North London, Trebus was constantly in trouble with the environmental health department of the London Borough of Haringey because of complaints about the rubbish surrounding his home. He lived in a tiny area on the ground floor of his house, surrounded by piles of rubbish, because he never threw anything away. He was eventually rehoused at the Trentfield Nursing Home in Southgate, where he died at the age of 83. Following his death, the BBC broadcast an hour-long tribute, Mr Trebus: A Life of Grime.

See also
Alexander Kennedy Miller
Collyer brothers

References

External links
 
 The Independent article
 The Telegraph article

1918 births
2002 deaths
Hoarders
People from Crouch End
Polish emigrants to the United Kingdom
Polish military personnel of World War II
Compulsive hoarding